Defending champion Roger Federer defeated Novak Djokovic in the final, 6–3, 7–5 to win the men's singles tennis title at the 2015 Dubai Tennis Championships. He did not lose a single set in the entire tournament. It was Federer's seventh Dubai title, second title of 2015, and 84th career title.

Seeds

 Novak Djokovic (final)
 Roger Federer (champion)
 Andy Murray (quarterfinals)
 Tomáš Berdych (semifinals)
 Ernests Gulbis (first round)
 Feliciano López (second round)
 Roberto Bautista Agut (second round)
 David Goffin (first round)

Draw

Finals

Top half

Bottom half

Qualifying

Seeds

 Jürgen Melzer (first round)
 Borna Ćorić (qualifying competition, Lucky loser)
 Marsel İlhan (qualified)
 James Ward (qualified)
 Lucas Pouille (qualified)
 Édouard Roger-Vasselin (first round)
 Evgeny Donskoy (first round)
 Nikoloz Basilashvili (first round)

Qualifiers

Lucky losers

Qualifying draw

First qualifier

Second qualifier

Third qualifier

Fourth qualifier

References
 Main Draw
 Qualifying Draw

Dubai Tennis Championships - Men's Singles
2015 Dubai Tennis Championships